Fresh Underground Culture Magazine (FUCM) is an Australian-based eco-political, satirical, free press publication.

Founded by brothers Bam and Up'n'Atom with the assistance of long-time friend Cedric Milner; FUCM was initially released as an e-zine on 1 February 2003 (01.02.03). The abbreviated print variation of the web based medium was published and distributed across the East Coast of Australia a little over a year later; on 2 March 2004.

FUCM in print 
Printed on an A2 poster (double sided, and folded down); the first ever release of FUCM featured the now popular — but then unknown — Australian actor Paul O'Brien (Home and Away) on its front cover. It had a satirical feature article titled 'George wins again!' describing the US President George W Bush's 3rd consecutive 'Stupid World Leader pageant' accolade. Of the seventeen contributors for the first issue 13 countries were represented.

The second issue moved away from a poster format, converting to a 140 mm x 140 mm saddle-bound glossy magazine; a size it has maintained.

FUCM released another four issues featuring eco-political, satirical, almost irreverent content written by a core of global contributors; Ginger Murray (current editor and founder of San Francisco based Whore magazine); Barry Brisco (currently contracted to the US version of Wheel of Fortune in the character role of 'Money'); and Tim Fisher (current editor of Australian Surfing Life magazine) among those.

Of the regular content, the Cookin and Flaccid News sections garnered an almost cult-like popularity. Cookin introduced the reader to banter between Bam & the Guv as they cooked legitimate recipes in entirely fictional surroundings for infamous celebrities and world leaders. Among those; Saddam Hussein, George Bush, Michael Jackson, Paris Hilton, and Dick Cheney. Flaccid News introduced brief stories completely lacking in any legitimacy or credibility. Both sections have continued to feature in all magazines printed to date.

FUCM became the official launch pad of the animated cartoon series The Audacious Adventures of Bam & Gumpy when it printed their first ever comic strip. Based loosely around a jazzfunkhiphouse styled band; with characters drawn by the well known Sydney based street artist 'Graf Master Mick'.

FUCM Guides to Eating Out 
In December 2005 FUCM launched its first guide to eating out in the iconic suburb of St Kilda, Melbourne. The first 'anti-ad' style guide of its kind anywhere. The response was so positive FUCM decided to make it a regular publication; releasing separate guides to Bondi, Kings Cross, Fitzroy and again in St Kilda leading into Autumn 2006. The demand for the guides to be published in other locations was so great that FUCM released a guide to Sydney and Melbourne in 6 December. In 7 December FUCM Eats Out in Melbourne 08 was released, featuring a cover and flipbook containing the illegitimate children of the 'Mofo' character first created for the Sydney/Melbourne guide, and continued with in the first Lazy-ass mofo's guide to Melbourne.

FUCM Lazy-ass Mofo's guides 
In April 2007 FUCM launched its first Lazy-ass mofo's guide to Melbourne. Featuring an afro-clad Ken doll, some Chinese made Barbie lookalikes and a Bratz doll on the cover; the guide reviewed what it felt (as suggested by its readers) were the best clothing stores, hair salons, bars, tattooists, and other random retail outlets in the coolest locations throughout Melbourne. It had a flipbook that detailed the afore mentioned Bratz doll beating down each of the Barbie lookalikes, before rounding on the afro clad Ken doll (supposedly meant to represent her pimp)...who she then acknowledged as a 'lazy-ass mofo'.

The most popular section — which also received the most complaints — was a section titled late night eateries. Late night eateries reviewed six of what would be considered the worst places to eat in Melbourne:

"For thousands of years shrewd food vendors have been capitalising on the famished stomachs of the heavily inebriated; tempting their blurred vision with glistening greasiness, their inability to articulate properly with extra servings, and their oft stretched moolah pouches with seemingly reasonable prices."

Four of the six reviews were under the guise of a contributor known as 'Hiroshi'; a non-English speaking exchange student from Japan. The real writer; Drew Mason, actually Google-translated the bent reviews he had created into Russian, before translating the Russian back into English.

The 08/09 issue of the Lazy-ass mofo's guide to Melbourne was released in June 2008. Its cover featured the young 'Mofo' kids defacing a wall with a graffiti piece resembling the FUCM logo; a hand with only one finger. The issue featured descriptions of new areas, not previously in the mag (Hawthorn, North Melbourne, Northcote, and Brunswick); an article on the history of Burma (Myanmar), up to and including Cyclone Nargis; and an article on the prevalence of straight 'sex' parties...written by Barry Brisco. The 'Cookin' section featured Zimbabwean President Robert Mugabe.

References 
libraries Australia
La Trobe University, Australia - Melbourne Media Map
FUCM - Fresh Underground Culture Magazine - official site
The Audacious Adventures of Bam & Gumpy
Barry Brisco - official site

2003 establishments in Australia
Magazines published in Australia
Magazines established in 2003
Satirical magazines
Political magazines published in Australia